HMS Kite (U87) was a Modified  sloop of the Royal Navy, once commanded by the famous U-boat hunter Captain Frederic John Walker. She was one of several ships of that class that took part in the famous "six in one trip" in 1944 (in which six U-boats were sunk in one patrol).

Named after the bird of the same name, she was built at Cammell Laird shipyard, Birkenhead, on the banks of the river Mersey (she was to later to be based across the river in Gladstone Dock, Bootle). She was launched on 13 October 1942 and commissioned on 1 March 1943.

Operational Service
Kite took part in the sinking of five U-boats together with several sister ships:

 On 30 July 1943  was sunk near Cape Ortegal by Kite, Woodpecker, Wren and Wild Goose.
 On 9 February 1944  was sunk south-west of Ireland by Kite,  and Starling.

Soon a pack of U-boats attacked the convoy and one U-boat was sunk by Fairey Swordfish aircraft from one of the carriers. Two more were sunk by other destroyers.

The decision to do so, rather than severing the foxers' cables and abandoning them, was made by her temporary commander, Lt Cdr Campbell, a submariner.

Five of the rescued died on board Keppel leaving only nine to make it to shore.
U-344 was sunk the next day by a single patrolling Swordfish from Vindex, piloted by Gordon Bennett, which dropped out of the cloud, surprising the U-Boat on the surface, a single depth charge exploded beneath the U-boat, sinking her with all hands.

Six in One
The U-boats sunk in the 6 in 1 patrol were as follows:
 - 31 January (Type VIIC)
 - 8 February (Type VIIC)
 - 9 February (Type VIIC)
 - 9 February (Type VIIC)
 - 11 February (Type VIIC)
 - 19 February (Type VIIC)

HMS Kite Memorial
On 21 August 2004, the 60th anniversary of Kites sinking a memorial stone was unveiled in the Braintree and Bocking Public Gardens.

References

External links
  HMS Kite history 

 

Black Swan-class sloops
World War II sloops of the United Kingdom
Sloops of the United Kingdom
Ships built on the River Mersey
Shipwrecks in the Barents Sea
World War II shipwrecks in the Arctic Ocean
1942 ships
Maritime incidents in August 1944
Ships sunk by German submarines in World War II